The 2020 Wake Forest Demon Deacons men's soccer team represented Wake Forest University during the 2020 NCAA Division I men's soccer season. It was the 74th season of the university fielding a program. It was the program's sixth season with Bobby Muuss as head coach. The Demon Deacons played their home matches at Spry Stadium.

The teams' 2020 season was significantly impacted by the COVID-19 pandemic, which curtailed the fall season and caused the NCAA Tournament to be played in Spring 2021. The ACC was one of the only two conferences in men's soccer to play in the fall of 2020.  The ACC also held a mini-season during the spring of 2021.

The Demon Deacons finished the fall season 5–1–0 and 7–2–0 in ACC play to finish in first place in the South Division.  In the ACC Tournament they lost to Virginia in the Quarterfinals.  They finished the spring season 4–0–2 and 3–0–2 in ACC play, to finish in third place in the Atlantic Division.  They received an at-large bid to the NCAA Tournament.  As the fifth seed in the tournament, they defeated Coastal Carolina in the Second Round and Kentucky in the Third Round before losing to North Carolina in the Quarterfinals to end their season.

Background

The 2019 Wake Forest men's soccer team finished the season with a 16–5–2 overall record and a 6–2–0 ACC record.  The Demon Deacons were seeded third–overall in the 2019 ACC Men's Soccer Tournament, where they defeated Virginia Tech in the Quarterfinals, but lost to eventual champions Virginia in the Semifinals.  The Demon Deacons earned an at-large bid into the 2019 NCAA Division I Men's Soccer Tournament.  As the fourth–overall seed in the tournament, Wake Forest defeated Maryland, Michigan, and UC Santa Barbara before being defeated by eventual runners-up Virginia in the Semifinals.

At the end of the season, two Demon Deacons men's soccer players were selected in the 2020 MLS SuperDraft: Alistair Johnston and Joey DeZart.

Player movement

Players leaving

Players arriving

Squad

Roster 

Updated:November 4, 2020

Team management

Source:

Schedule

Source:

|-
!colspan=6 style=""| Exhibition

|-
!colspan=6 style=""| Fall Regular season

|-
!colspan=6 style=""| ACC Tournament

|-
!colspan=6 style=""| Spring Regular season

|-
!colspan=6 style=""| NCAA Tournament

Awards and honors

2021 MLS Super Draft

Source:

Rankings

Fall 2020

Spring 2021

References

2020
Wake Forest Demon Deacons
Wake Forest Demon Deacons
Wake Forest Demon Deacons men's soccer
Wake Forest